Frederick Percival Mills (26 June 1919 – 25 July 1965) was an English boxer, and the world light heavyweight champion from 1948 to 1950.

Mills excelled first as a middleweight, and most successfully as a light-heavyweight boxer, but also fought as a heavyweight. He was described as Britain's biggest boxing idol in the post-war period and remained a popular media personality after his retirement from the ring.

Once he had retired from boxing, Mills moved into boxing management and promotion, and pursued a career in entertainment, working in radio, television (notably as co-presenter of  the early BBC TV music show, Six-Five Special between 1957 and 1958), and on the stage, as well as playing roles in a number of films between 1952 and 1965. He opened a Chinese restaurant in Soho before there was an established Chinatown in the area and also ran his own London nightclub until his mysterious death.

Early life 
He was born Frederick Percival Mills in Bournemouth, Hampshire, the youngest of the four children of Thomas James Mills, a totter and marine store dealer, and his wife Lottie Hilda Gray. He received a pair of boxing gloves when he was eleven, and he used to spar with his brother Charlie. He attended St Michael's School in Bournemouth until the age of fourteen, and then became an apprentice gardener and later a milkman's assistant. The milkman in question was Percy Cook, brother of former Welsh lightweight champion Gordon Cook, and Percy helped Mills develop his boxing skills.

Professional career

Early career
Mills had three bouts in 1936 in a 11 stone novices’ competition, all of which he won by knockout. He subsequently signed professional terms with manager Bob Turner. He began fighting in fairground booths and at venues on the south coast. His first 64 fights, in 3½ years, most fighting as a middleweight, though often against heavier opponents, resulted in 48 wins, 9 losses and 7 draws. By late 1939 he was the Western Area middleweight champion, and in April 1940 he beat Eastern Area champion Ginger Sadd on points. At the time, Mills was ranked 9th best middleweight in Britain, and Sadd 2nd.

In January 1940 he joined the Royal Air Force and went on to become first a corporal physical training instructor and, by the following year, a sergeant, while continuing to box professionally. He fought Jock McAvoy, the British and Commonwealth middleweight champion, the fight made at 12st 9lbs, McAvoy having the previous year unsuccessfully fought Len Harvey for the British and Commonwealth light-heavyweight titles. The fight against McAvoy took place in Liverpool in August 1940 and Mills won a clear decision over ten rounds. Mills subsequent fought mainly at light heavyweight.

In 1941 he was taken on by new manager Ted Broadribb, and began an affair with Broadribb's daughter Chrissie, who was at the time married to South African boxer Don McCorkindale. In September 1941 he was disqualified for a low blow in the third round against Jack Hyams, suffering his first defeat in almost two years.

In November 1941 he stopped heavyweight Jim Wilde in the third round, despite conceding almost two and a half stones to the Welshman. In December 1941, he fought Jack London, a heavyweight who later (in 1944) won the British and Commonwealth heavyweight titles, Mills won on points over ten rounds despite conceding over three stones in weight to London. At this time Mills was nicknamed 'The Bournemouth Bombshell'.

British light-heavyweight title
Mills was due to fight McAvoy in January 1942 in a final eliminator for the British and Empire (later 'Commonwealth') light-heavyweight title, but withdrew from the fight, stating that wanted to concentrate on fighting at heavyweight and challenge for Len Harvey's title. He beat Tom Reddington at heavyweight later that month, but evidently had a change of heart, and in February 1942 fought McAvoy in a final eliminator for the light-heavyweight titles. The fight, in the Royal Albert Hall, ended after one round when McAvoy was forced to retire with an injured back. The way was open for Mills to challenge Len Harvey for the British and Empire light-heavyweight titles (Harvey at the time also holding the British heavyweight title).

The title fight took place on 20 June 1942, at White Hart Lane, Tottenham, in front of a crowd of 30,000. In the second round Mills caught Harvey with a powerful left hook and put him down for a count of nine. When Harvey got up Mills hit him with a left uppercut, knocking him through the ropes and off the ring canvas, and in doing so he won via a knockout. The fight created a sensation and Mills was talked of as a future challenger for Joe Louis. Mills now had the light-heavyweight titles. Harvey had also been considered world champion by the British Boxing Board of Control (BBBofC), but Mills decided not to accept the title, instead wishing to fight for American Gus Lesnevich's more recognised world title. Mills only fought competitively four times in the next two years, all of them wins inside the distance, although he fought several exhibition fights, including several bouts with McCorkindale. Difficulty in making fights led him to consider relinquishing his titles in 1943, expressing a desire to switch to all-in wrestling.

Len Harvey's retirement in early 1943 left the British and Empire heavyweight titles vacant. Mills and London were nominated to fight for the titles by the BBBofC in April that year, but after the fight was postponed three times, twice due to injuries sustained by London, they eventually met in September 1944. The fight took place at the Kings Hall, Belle Vue, Manchester, with Mills conceding just over three stone (19 kilos) in weight. Both men were at the time serving in the Royal Air Force. Mills showed speed and aggression, but London's superior strength and power were evident in the closing stages and the heavier man was awarded the decision after fifteen rounds.

Mills and London were set to fight again in February 1945, but London's RAF duties made it impossible for him to train. Instead, Mills fought former Scottish amateur heavyweight champion Ken Shaw, stopping him in the seventh round.

World title fight
In March 1945, Mills was posted to India and Burma as part of a touring party that also included Denis Compton, giving lectures and boxing demonstrations and taking part in exhibition bouts.

Mills returned to the UK and was demobilised in March 1946, and in May 1946 he was given a shot at Lesnevich's world light-heavyweight title. Mills' preparation was interrupted in April when his father died at his home in Bournemouth. The fight took place at Harringay Arena in front of 11,000 fans. Mills was not considered a serious threat to Lesnevich but performed better than many expected in what was described as a "slam-bang, punishing contest". Mills was floored heavily in the second round but recovered strongly and was cheered on by the British crowd. In the ninth round, Mills's aggression appeared to be turning the fight in his favour, and Lesnevich was troubled by cuts above his eyes. In the tenth, however, Lesnevich "exploded" to score two knockdowns and the referee stopped the contest.

Three weeks after losing his fight against Lesnevich, Mills fought British heavyweight Bruce Woodcock, losing a twelve-round fight on points after being knocked down in the fourth.

Mills returned in August 1946 with a first-round knockout of the Swedish heavyweight John Nilsson. In November 1946, Mills fought another heavyweight, American Joe Baksi. Mills suffered two badly cut eyes and retired after six rounds of what was described as a "disappointingly one-sided contest".

European title
In 1947, Mills again focused on the light-heavyweight division, and had three wins by knockout in the first half of the year (one against Italian champion Enrico Bertola and the third against South African champion Nick Wolmarans in Johannesburg) before losing in June by KO to American Lloyd Marshall.

In September 1947, Mills fought for the vacant European light-heavyweight title against the Belgian, Pol Goffaux, winning after Goffaux retired towards the end of the fourth round. Mills ended the year with a points win over French heavyweight Stephane Olek.

Mills defended the European title in February 1948, against the Spanish champion Paco Bueno, who was subjected to "terrific punishment" before being knocked out in the second round.

In April 1948 he beat the heavyweight Ken Shaw for a second time, in a final eliminator for the British title.

World title
On 26 July 1948, Mills was matched against Lesnevich for his second attempt at the world light heavyweight title. Mills was in much better shape for this fight, held at the White City Stadium, London in front of a 46,000 crowd. Lesnevich reportedly struggled to make the 175 pound limit, weighing in at 174¾ pounds, whereas Mills came in at 170½.

Lesnevich, who was a 1/3 betting favourite, suffered from cuts over the eyes from the opening round as Mills started strongly. The fight then settled down into a "remarkably dull" affair, which drew boos from the crowd and saw both men warned by the referee Teddy Waltham for the lack of action. In the tenth round, Mills rallied and floored Lesnevich heavily on two occasions. Lesnevich launched a "savage attack" in the twelfth and thirteenth rounds, but Mills responded in the last two sessions and at the end of fifteen rounds, the British boxer was awarded the decision by the referee.

Mills was set to defend his title against Lesnevich in September in New York, but the fight was cancelled due to Mills suffering severe headaches and bouts of dizziness since the July fight. In August medical opinion was sought and he was diagnosed with misaligned vertebrae at the base of the skull; It was decided that after two months rest and spinal treatment he could return to boxing.

In September 1948, Mills was challenged to a fight at light-heavyweight by Sugar Ray Robinson, but it was dismissed as "ridiculous" by promoter Jack Solomons.

Mills beat another heavyweight, Johnny Ralph, in Johannesburg in November 1948 in an eliminator for the Empire heavyweight title. Mills broke a metacarpal in his right hand during the fight.

In early 1949, after a well-received appearance with Arthur Askey on the radio show How Do You Do?, Mills expressed a desire to work in radio after his boxing career ended, stating "I am not going on fighting for ever. I've got some money now. I reckon that being on the radio would just about suit me." In March 1949, Mills signed a promotional contract with Solomons, which made any return fight with Lesnevich more likely to take place in Britain.

In June 1949, Mills challenged Bruce Woodcock for his British, Empire, and European heavyweight titles. The fight was also recognised as an eliminator for the British version of the World Heavyweight Championship. They fought at the White City Stadium, with Mills conceding twenty pounds in weight to his opponent. Mills bloodied the heavyweight's nose but was floored four times before being knocked out in the fourteenth round.

Shortly after the Woodcock fight, Mills expressed a willingness to defend his light-heavyweight title later that year, although he wanted the purse money to be spread over five years, for tax reasons, and to guarantee him an income for several years after retiring from the ring, Mills clearly not intending to keep fighting for much longer.

In September 1949, a contract was signed for Mills to defend his world title against American Joey Maxim. After several dates and venues were proposed, the fight was finally set for 24 January 1950 at Earls Court, London. Mills decided to leave long-time trainer Nat Sellers and train himself for the fight. Mills began strongly but Maxim, who "boxed beautifully", began to overhaul him. Mills, according to press reports, looked for a knockout win, but in the tenth round he was floored by a left right combination. Mills took the count in a sitting position before falling sideways and being counted out. Mills was assisted to his corner and was checked by a doctor before leaving the ring. He had fought the last four rounds with three of his teeth knocked out and one embedded in the gum of his upper jaw. Mills' reign as world champion was over, and the next day Broadribb announced that he had decided to retire, a decision made formal on 15 February when Mills wrote to BBBofC to confirm his retirement and to relinquish his British, European, and Empire light-heavyweight titles, aged 30.

Personal life 
On 30 September 1948, Mills married Christine Marie McCorkindale ("Chrissie") (25 December 1913 - 4 November 1994) at Herne Hill Methodist Church. She had a son, Donnie, by former husband Don McCorkindale. They honeymooned in South Africa, where they stayed with McCorkindale, with whom Mills was good friends.

Mills and his wife went on to have two daughters, Susan Marhea (born 17 June 1952) and Amanda Christine Elizabeth (born 12 June 1958). They lived, with Donnie, at Joggi Villa in Denmark Hill in South London from June 1947.

Retirement and other business interests

Boxing management and promotion
A month after confirming his retirement, Mills was granted a manager's licence by the BBBofC, taking on Brixton heavyweight Terry O'Connor as his first boxer. In June 1950, Mills' autobiography, Twenty Years, was published. In 1951 he gained a promoter's licence and put on many successful events until the mid-1950s.

During the latter stages of his boxing career, Mills suffered from frequent headaches, which continued after his retirement. Mills taught boxing classes at the Streatham Youth Centre in the early 1960s.

In October 1962 his world championship belt was stolen from his car, but it was returned three days later with a note from the thief apologising for stealing it.

Entertainment
Mills made an appearance on the television show Rooftop Rendezvous in February 1950, earning praise for his comedy skills. In May 1950 he did his first television commentary on the Dennis Powell v. Mel Brown card at Birmingham, broadcast by the BBC, which saw him described as "discovery of the week" by the Daily Herald. In late 1950 he again appeared on radio as a presenter of the programme Calling All Forces. In March 1952 he was given a 12-week Saturday radio show by the BBC. In 1952 he made his first film appearance in Emergency Call, going on to take small rôles in a dozen films.

In September 1954 he was knocked unconscious during a TV sketch after being hit over the head with a real stool rather than the prop that should have been used. He made appearances on several other television and radio shows, and became a presenter on the BBC pop-music programme Six-Five Special from February 1957 until being dropped from the show in March 1958, although he returned for the final show at the end of the year. He went on to perform on stage as part of The Dickie Henderson Show later that year, staying with Henderson until the early 1960s. In 1959 he performed in Dick Whittington in Hulme, playing Idle Jack. In 1961 he appeared in a Summer stage show in Brighton with Alfred Marks.

He was the subject of This Is Your Life, when he was surprised by Eamonn Andrews in the foyer of London's Earls Court Exhibition Centre. The episode was broadcast on 2 January 1961.

By 1963, television appearances had become less frequent, although he appeared on variety show Big Night Out in January 1964.

Property, restaurant and night club
Mills began investing in property in the late 1940s, acquiring several houses and flats. In 1946 he opened the Freddie Mills Chinese Restaurant at 143 Charing Cross Road as a joint venture with Charles Luck and actor Andy Ho. He also briefly jointly owned a café in Peckham with his friend and investment adviser Bill Bavin. By 1963 the Chinese restaurant was no longer profitable, and Mills and Ho converted it to a nightclub ('The Freddie Mills Nite Spot') at a cost of around £12,000, re-opening in May that year. After initially hoping to make the club a family venue, they were pressured into allowing 'hostesses' to work there, unknown to Mills a euphemism for prostitutes. He became friends with the Kray Twins, notorious criminals who frequented his club. In August 1963 Mills and Ho started the Freddie Mills Theatrical Agency, based at the club.

After its initial success his nightclub began to fail and he tried to sell it, without success. He sold off what property he had but was in serious financial difficulty.

Death 
On 24 July 1965, Mills was found dead in his car, parked in Goslett Yard, off an alleyway behind his nightclub. A fairground rifle was found in the car with Mills, who had been shot through his right eye.
He had told the nightclub staff that he was going for a nap in his car, something that he often did. His body was found at approximately 11:45 p.m. by doorman Robert Deacon.
An ambulance was not called until Mills' wife arrived over an hour later. A week or two previously, he had borrowed a 0.22 calibre rifle from May Ronaldson, whom he knew from his boxing booth days, and who ran a shooting gallery. Although the rifle was not in working order when borrowed, it had apparently been repaired and was found in the car alongside him.
For whatever reason, still unknown and with no police in attendance, ambulance personnel removed Mills from his car, disturbing a possible crime scene, and transported his body to the Middlesex Hospital where he was pronounced dead.

The investigation into his death initially assumed murder, but within a couple of days, the police had decided not to investigate it as such. The coroner's inquest heard that the angle of the bullet was consistent with a self-inflicted wound, and it ruled his death a suicide.

Mills's funeral took place at St. Giles’ Parish Church, Camberwell, and he was buried in Camberwell New Cemetery, South London. The pallbearers included boxing promoter Jack Solomons, British Heavyweight Champion Henry Cooper, the Secretary of the BBBofC, Teddy Waltham, and entertainer Bruce Forsyth (who also gave the funeral address). His grave has a marble boxing glove on it, beneath which is an urn containing a real boxing glove.

Despite the wealth that Mills had gained from his boxing career (estimated at £100,000), and his property investments that earned him around £3,000 per year, Mills died with a net figure of only £387 to his name. His club had been up for sale since June 1963, but he had been unable to find a buyer. At the time of his death, he was heavily in debt to a crime syndicate, which led him to be both depressed and in fear of his life. He was rumoured to be making a stand against protection racketeers shortly before his death, a theory backed up by gangland enforcer Johnny Bradbury, who gave the name of the man he believed was responsible for killing Mills to the police, but they were unable to find evidence to pursue the matter. Two weeks before his death, Mills and Ho had been fined for liquor and gaming offences committed at the club, and Mills had asked for a catering job at a pub near his home.

A star-studded benefit show, The Freddie Mills Night, was staged in February 1966 to raise money to support his widow and children.

Following his death, several lurid theories sprang up, such as that Mills, married with children, had been arrested in a public toilet and charged with indecency, and that his suicide had been staged by Chinese gangsters who were seeking to take over his club. In 2002, a book about Mills by former journalist Michael Litchfield contained allegations that at the time of his death he was about to be exposed as the serial killer known as "Jack the Stripper", the unidentified person responsible for the eight Hammersmith nude murders in 1964–65. Litchfield also claimed that Mills had had a homosexual relationship with singer Michael Holliday, and possibly also was sexually involved with notorious gangster Ronnie Kray.

Mills's family and friends did not accept the suicide verdict, and according to Bavin, his widow received a phone call some time after his death from a woman who told her who was responsible for killing him. In 1968, Leonard "Nipper" Read began investigating the case again at Chrissie's behest. There were some inconsistencies regarding the death: two shots had been fired in the car, one from a front seat which hit the nearside front door, and the one that had killed Mills while he was sitting on the car's back seat, Mills's body was found with its hands resting on his knees and the gun in a position out of Mills's reach, and there were no fingerprints found on it.

In November 1970, police began investigating again after a constituent had told MP Michael O'Halloran that a man had admitted killing Mills, although the investigation was soon ended.

Phoenix Television produced a documentary about the death of Mills, Murder in Soho: Who Killed Freddie Mills? Directed by Simon Dales, it was first broadcast by the BBC on 1 August 2018. The film explored the possibility that American mobster, Meyer Lansky, colluded in the killing of Mills; Roger Huntman, said his father, Benny Huntman, a boxing manager was involved in the murder.

Evaluation as a boxer 
The boxing statistics site BoxRec rates Mills as the fourteenth-best British boxer of all time, the second-best British boxer of all time in the light-heavyweight division (behind John Conteh), and the thirty-sixth-best light-heavyweight in the history of boxing.

Selected filmography
 Emergency Call (1952) - Tim Mahoney
 One Jump Ahead (1955) - Bert Tarrant
 Fun at St. Fanny's (1955) - Harry The Scar
 Breakaway (1955) - Pat
 Kill Me Tomorrow (1957) - Waxy Lister
 Six-Five Special (1958) - Studio Commissionaire / Lighting Man
 Chain of Events (1958) - Tiny
 Carry On Constable (1960) - Jewel Thief
 Carry On Regardless (1961) - Lefty
 This Is Your Life (1961) S.6 Ed.16
 Saturday Night Out (1964) - Joe
 The Comedy Man (1964) - Indian Chief (uncredited)
 Joey Boy (1965) - Sergeant (uncredited) (final film role)

Professional boxing record

See also 
List of light heavyweight boxing champions
List of British light-heavyweight boxing champions

References

Sources
Bavin, Bill (1975) The Strange Death of Freddie Mills, Howard Baker Press,

External links 
 
Freddie Mills - CBZ Profile

1919 births
1965 suicides
English male boxers
Light-heavyweight boxers
People from Parkstone
Sportspeople from Dorset
Suicides by firearm in England
Sportspeople from Bournemouth
1965 deaths
Royal Air Force personnel of World War II
BBC television presenters
20th-century English male actors
Royal Air Force airmen
Royal Air Force Physical Training instructors